
Gmina Gąbin is an urban-rural gmina (administrative district) in Płock County, Masovian Voivodeship, in east-central Poland.

Villages
Apart from the town of Gąbin, Gmina Gąbin contains the villages and settlements of Borki, Czermno, Dobrzyków, Górki, Góry Małe, Grabie Polskie, Guzew, Jadwigów, Jordanów, Kamień-Słubice, Karolew, Kępina, Konstantynów, Koszelew, Lipińskie, Ludwików, Nowa Korzeniówka, Nowe Grabie, Nowe Wymyśle, Nowy Kamień, Nowy Troszyn, Okolusz, Piaski, Plebanka, Potrzebna, Przemysłów, Rumunki, Stara Korzeniówka, Stary Kamień, Strzemeszno, Topólno and Troszyn Polski.

Neighbouring gminas
Gmina Gąbin is bordered by the city of Płock and by the gminas of Łąck, Pacyna, Sanniki, Słubice, Słupno and Szczawin Kościelny.

References
Polish official population figures 2006

Gabin
Płock County